The Battle of Fei (肥之戰) was a military conflict between the Qin and Zhao states of China in 233 BCE during the Warring States period. The campaign was part of Qin's campaigns to unify China under its rule. It resulted in a decisive victory for the Zhao forces, led by General Li Mu, against the Qin invaders.

Opening moves
In 234 BCE, the Qin forces defeated the Zhao armies at Pingyang (平陽; south-east of present-day Ci County, Hebei province). In the following year, the Qin army led by Huan Yi (桓齮) embarked from Shangdang (上黨) and attacked the Zhao army from the rear. The Zhao army sustained over 100,000 casualties and its commander, Hu Zhe (扈輒), was killed in action. Huan Yi's force crossed Mount Taihang and conquered the Zhao territories of Chili (赤麗) and Yi'an (宜安), both in the south-east of present-day Shijiazhuang, Hebei province.

The battle
King Qian of Zhao recalled Li Mu, a general famous for his success in defending Zhao's northern border from the Xiongnu, and appointed Li as the commander-in-chief of the Zhao armies to resist the Qin invaders.

Li Mu's army from the northern border met the Zhao forces from Handan at Yi'an and engaged the Qin army there. Li Mu felt that the Qin army's morale was high after its earlier victories, so it would be unwise for Zhao to attack Qin then. He ordered his troops to strengthen their fortifications and defences while waiting for an opportunity to launch an counteroffensive. Huan Yi felt that a swift conclusion to the battle was necessary since his troops were growing weary after so many earlier battles, so he led his force to attack Fei, intending to lure the Zhao army there to defend their position. Li Mu's deputy, Zhao Cong (趙蔥), suggested to Li to send a force to rescue Fei, but Li refused.

As the bulk of the Qin army had left to attack Fei, the Qin camp was poorly defended so Li Mu seized the opportunity to order his troops to launch an offensive on the Qin camp. The Zhao forces scored a major victory in the ensuing battle and captured several prisoners-of-war and supplies. As Li Mu predicted that Huan Yi would retreat from Fei to save the camp, he ordered his men to lay an ambush on Huan Yi's retreat route. Huan Yi's retreating troops fell into the ambush. Qin sustained over 100,000 casualties in the battle and its army was almost completely wiped out. Huan Yi succeeded in breaking out of the encirclement.

References

233 BC
Fei 233 BC
3rd century BC in China